Godemir or Godimir (fl. 970 – 1000/1030) was Ban of Croatia during 10th century Croatia. He is said to have served the kings Michael Krešimir II and Stephen Držislav in a charter from 1068. According to the much debated Chronicle of Archdeacon Goricensis John, he was established to his position by a certain King Krešimir (though it is unclear whether the chronicler mixes two different rulers).

Additionally, he is mentioned in another charter, dated 1028, which is a grant to the monastery of St. Krševan by his sister Helenica.

References

External links
Godemir on Croatian Encyclopedia

10th-century Croatian people 
11th-century Croatian people 
Bans of Croatia
10th-century Croatian nobility
11th-century Croatian nobility
10th-century rulers in Europe
11th-century rulers in Europe